Jaydeep Sarangi (Bengali: জয়দীপ ষড়ঙ্গী) is a bilingual writer, poet, and critic.

Early life
Jaydeep Sarangi was born on 11 December 1973 in Jhargram, West Bengal.

See also
Dalit Literature

References

Dutta, Angana and Sarangi, Jaydeep (2015) Trans. Eds. Surviving in My world: Growing up Dalit in Bengal. Kolkata: Stree-Samya.

Sarangi, Jaydeep Ed. "Stories of Social Awakening:Jatin Bala", Authorspress, New Delhi, 2017

Living people
Bengali writers
Poets from West Bengal
People from Jhargram district
Year of birth missing (living people)
Writers from West Bengal